By is a village in the municipality of Åfjord in Trøndelag county, Norway.

See also
List of short place names

References

Villages in Trøndelag
Åfjord